was a village located in Higashikubiki District, Niigata Prefecture, Japan.

The village was established in 1901 by merging the nearby villages of Kawabe, Kawakami and Kunimi. Maki had a population of 2,940 as of January 1, 2003.

On January 1, 2005, Maki, along with the town of Yasuzuka, the villages of Ōshima and Uragawara (all from Higashikubiki District), the towns of Itakura, Kakizaki, Ōgata and Yoshikawa, the villages of Kiyosato, Kubiki, Nakagō and Sanwa (all from Nakakubiki District), and the town of Nadachi (from Nishikubiki District), was merged into the expanded city of Jōetsu.

The second floor of the museum contains exhibits relating to the history of the village.

References

Dissolved municipalities of Niigata Prefecture
Jōetsu, Niigata